Senator Butterworth may refer to:

Benjamin Butterworth (1837–1898), Ohio State Senate
Frank Butterworth (1870–1950),  Connecticut State Senate
Jim Butterworth (politician), Georgia State Senate